The 2018–19 Horizon League men's basketball season began with practices in October 2018, followed by the start of the 2018–19 NCAA Division I men's basketball season in November. Conference play began in January 2019 and concluded in February 2019. The season marked the 39th season of Horizon League basketball.

Preseason

Preseason poll
Source

() first place votes

Preseason All-Conference Teams
Source

Preseason Player of the Year: Drew McDonald, Northern Kentucky

Conference previews

Watchlists

Regular season

Schedule

Exhibition schedule

Non-conference schedule

Conference schedule

Conference matrix
This table summarizes the head-to-head results between teams in conference play.

Conference chart

Horizon vs. other conferences

Points scored

Coaches

Coaching changes
On March 26, 2018, Detroit Mercy fired head coach Bacari Alexander after two seasons. On June 5, the school hired Texas Southern head coach Mike Davis as the Titans' new coach.

Rankings

Postseason

Horizon League Tournament

NCAA Tournament

National Invitation Tournament

Awards and honors

Weekly awards

Conference awards and teams

References